Sylvirana annamitica, the Annam stream frog, is a frog in the family Ranidae.  It is endemic to Vietnam and Laos.  Scientists think it may also live in China.

Scientists consider this frog a sister taxon of Sylvirana montosa.

References

Frogs of Asia
annamitica